Safety Bay Road is an east-west metropolitan road located in the City of Rockingham, about  south of Perth, Western Australia. The road starts in Rockingham's coastal suburbs and heads south from Peron past Lake Richmond. The road then turns left at the coast with a roundabout with Arcadia Drive which is a coastal road in Shoalwater. Safety Bay Road takes a left turn and extends past Ennis Avenue and Warnbro railway station to the newer suburban estates at Baldivis, before ending just past the Kwinana Freeway. As such, it forms a key link between Rockingham, Perth and Mandurah. Until 2009, the end of the road marked the start of the Kwinana Freeway.

Safety Bay Road was gazetted in 1949, having first existed as two roads - Road No.10168, and a coastal road in Safety Bay known as "The Esplanade".

Major intersections
The entire road's length is in the City of Rockingham, with all intersections listed below controlled by roundabouts unless otherwise indicated.

See also

References

Roads in Perth, Western Australia
City of Rockingham